Isaac Bentham (27 October 1886 Lancashire – 15 May 1917) was a British water polo player who competed in the 1912 Summer Olympics. He was part of the British team, which was able to win the gold medal.

He was killed in action, aged 30, in the Battle of Arras during World War I. He died on 15 May 1917, whilst serving as a sergeant in the Royal Field Artillery on the Western Front in France. He has no known grave. He is commemorated on the Arras War Memorial.

See also
 Great Britain men's Olympic water polo team records and statistics
 List of Olympic champions in men's water polo
 List of Olympic medalists in water polo (men)
 List of Olympians killed in World War I

References

External links

 
http://www.cwgc.org/find-war-dead/casualty/740690

1886 births
1917 deaths
British military personnel killed in World War I
British male water polo players
Water polo players at the 1912 Summer Olympics
Olympic water polo players of Great Britain
Olympic gold medallists for Great Britain
English Olympic medallists
Olympic medalists in water polo
Medalists at the 1912 Summer Olympics
Royal Field Artillery soldiers
British Army personnel of World War I